Maksim Oluić (born 20 May 1998) is a Croatian football player who plays as a defender.

Club career
A youth international since the under-15 level, Oluić went through the academies of several Zagreb-based clubs, starting at Dinamo Zagreb until the age of 10, NK Dubrava until the age of 13, and then NK Zagreb until the age of 16 when he moved to NK Lokomotiva. At Lokomotiva, he went on to make his first-team debut on 25 February 2017, coming on for Lovro Majer in the 78th minute in a 2–0 home win against NK Osijek. He went on to participate in 16 more Prva HNL matches for the club, before leaving in the summer of 2018 for NK Rudeš.

References

External links
 

1998 births
Living people
Footballers from Zagreb
Association football central defenders
Croatian footballers
Croatia youth international footballers
Croatia under-21 international footballers
NK Lokomotiva Zagreb players
NK Rudeš players
NK Rudar Velenje players
Croatian Football League players
Croatian expatriate footballers
Expatriate footballers in Slovenia
Croatian expatriate sportspeople in Slovenia